Donkervoort D10 is an ultra-light weight sports car manufactured by Donkervoort in Lelystad, Netherlands between 1988 to 1994. It is the third in series of Donkervoort sports cars, the two previous models being Donkervoort S7 and Donkervoort S8. It was first produced for celebrating Donkervoort's 10th anniversary.

References

Cars introduced in 1988
D10
Cars discontinued in 1989